The first edition of the Audi Cup was a two-day association football tournament that featured four teams, and was staged in late July 2009 at the Allianz Arena in Munich, Germany. The competition was organised and promoted by car manufacturer Audi AG to celebrate their 100th year of trading, and hosted by 2007–08 Bundesliga champions Bayern Munich. Bayern Munich defeated Manchester United in the final in a penalty shoot-out after a goalless draw. Boca Juniors defeated Milan in the third place match.

Participating teams

Competition format
The competition took the format of the latter stages of a regular knock-out competition. The winners of each of the two matches on the first day compete against each other for the Audi Cup, whilst the two losing sides play in a third-place match. The draw for the 2009 Audi Cup semi-finals was made on the Audi stand at the Geneva Motor Show, on 3 March 2009. The draw was conducted by Audi representative Tom Kristensen, in the presence of an official representative from each participating team. Gennaro Gattuso (Milan), Wes Brown (Manchester United), Carlos Bianchi (Boca Juniors) and Willy Sagnol (Bayern Munich) were present on behalf of their clubs. The trophy was contested over two days, each day seeing two matches played back-to-back.

Matches

Semi-finals

Third place play-off

Final

Goalscorers
2 goals
 Thomas Müller (Bayern Munich)

1 goal
 Anderson (Manchester United)
 Federico Insúa (Boca Juniors)
 Andrea Pirlo (Milan)
 Bastian Schweinsteiger (Bayern Munich)
 Saër Sène (Bayern Munich)
 Thiago Silva (Milan)
 Antonio Valencia (Manchester United)
 Lucas Viatri (Boca Juniors)

References

External links

2009–10 in German football
Audi Cup